Giuliana Benetton (born 8 July 1937) is an Italian billionaire businesswoman, one of the co-founders of Benetton Group, the Italian fashion brand.

In May 2015, Forbes estimated the net worth of Giuliana Benetton and each of her three siblings at US$2.9 billion.

She is married with four children and lives in Treviso, Italy.

References

1937 births
Giuliana
Female billionaires
Italian billionaires
Living people
People from Treviso